Coptotriche gaunacella is a species of moth belonging to the family Tischeriidae.

It is native to Europe.

References

Tischeriidae
Moths described in 1843